ASA University Bangladesh (ASAUB) is a private university in Shyamoli, Dhaka, Bangladesh. The university was established under the Private University Act 1992. ASAUB is affiliated by the University Grants Commission Bangladesh. Md. Muinuddin Khan (widely known as M. M. Khan) was the premier vice-chancellor of ASAUB, and he held the position for five years. The present vice-chancellor of ASAUB is Dalem Chandra Barman.

Graduate programs 

 MBA, majors in finance, marketing, accounting, management, HRM, MIS
 LLM, 
 MPH, 
 MA in English, final and preliminary
 B Pharm
 BBA
 B.A (Hon's) in English
 B.S.S (Hon's) in Applied Sociology
 L.L.B.(Hon)

Faculty of Science & Engineering
 B.Pharm.
 MPH

Upcoming programs

Faculty of Arts & Social Science
 BSS in Journalism & Mass Communication
 MSS in Journalism & Mass Communication
 MSS in Applied Sociology and Development Studies
Faculty of Science & Engineering
 Bsc. in Civil Engineering
 Bsc. in Electronics & Telecommunication Engineering
 Bsc. in Textile Engineering

Faculty heads 

 Md. Saiful Alam, Dean, Faculty of Law
 Azizar Rahman Khan Dean, Faculty of Business
 Abu Daud Hassan, Dean, Faculty of Arts & Social Sciences
 Kohinur Begum, Dean, Faculty of Science

List of vice-chancellors 
 Md. Iqbal Khan Chowdhury.

Admission eligibility 

Students who have passed SSC and HSC or equivalent examinations with at least two second divisions or minimum GPA 2.5 in each (in the scale of 5.00) may apply for admission. For A level students, at least five subjects in O level with minimum GPA 2.5 and two subjects in A level with minimum GPA 2.5 (A=5, B=4, C=3, D=2, E=1 [only one E is acceptable]) are required.

Campus

Library 

ASA University Bangladesh has a large and spacious library which is on the second floor. The ASAUB library can accommodate more than 200 students at a time. The library  has a sufficient numbers of books, newspapers, journals, etc. Faculty members of ASAUB get special opportunities for continuing their research and study in the library. The environment of the library is very nice and facilitated by central air conditioning. It opens every day at 8.00 am.

Computer labs 

ASA University Bangladesh has three labs with about 200 computers and high-speed broadband Internet connection. Students can use lab any time except restricted periods.

Auditorium 

ASA University Bangladesh has a big auditorium on the ninth floor. This auditorium can hold about 650 students at a time. It is used to hold meetings, seminars, cultural functions and orientations.

Co-curricular activities 

ASA University is a great source of co-curricular activities. Many clubs and associations play a fundamental role in developing student creativity and personal skills. Every department has some clubs which are run by the students with the help of teachers. There are about four clubs in the Faculty of the Department of Business Administration, nine clubs in the Faculty of Law, and one club (English Club) in the Department of English. These clubs arrange and organize cultural programs, seminars, conferences, workshops, competitions, social activities, etc.

Publications 

ASA University Review is one of the reputed research publications which bring out immense significance globally. The Faculty of Law publishes Student’s Law Review (very first magazine of ASAUB). It publishes every semester by the initiative of the students of law with the help of teachers. Khaled Saifullah (Editor) and Mahbubur Rahman Nazmi (Asst. Editor) are the initiators of this journal. A business magazine Synergy is publishes from the Department of Business Administration. The Department of English has some wall magazines. Scribble and "Scudding Drifts" are the updated ones in association with the English Club. English Club also efforts on publishing a yearly magazine titled "Symphony" from the Department of English designed with the creative writings of the respective students and teachers.

References 

Private universities in Bangladesh
Educational institutions established in 2006
Universities and colleges in Dhaka
2006 establishments in Bangladesh